The Stockholm municipal election of 1991 was held on 15 September 1991 concurrently with the 1991 Swedish parliamentary election.  This election used a party-list proportional representation system to allocate the 101 seats of the Stockholm City Council (Stockholms stadsfullmäktige) amongst the various Swedish political parties.  Voter turnout was 81.6%.

Three political parties gained seats on the Stockholm City Council for the first time as a result of this election.  The oldest was the Christian Democratic Social Party, which was founded in 1964, and also won a parliamentary mandate for the first time in this election.  Another new addition was the Swedish Green Party, which had been participating in elections since 1982 but first won seats on the city council in this election; though they were already represented in the national Swedish Riksdag since the elections of 1988.  The last new party on the city council was New Democracy, a new right-wing party which also entered the Riksdag for the first time in this year.

As a result, a total of nine political parties were represented on the Stockholm City Council after this election, the most at any point as of the 2006 elections.

The Social Democrats were allocated 33 seats as a result of this election, which at the time was their lowest mandate since the introduction of universal male suffrage in 1911.

Results

See also
 Elections in Sweden
 List of political parties in Sweden
 City of Stockholm

References
Statistics Sweden, Allmänna valen 1991. Del 2 – Kommunala valen den 15 September 1991. pp. 267, 500
Statistics Sweden, "Kommunfullmäktigval – valresultat" (Swedish) 
Statistics Sweden, "Kommunfullmäktigval – erhållna mandat efter kommun och parti. Valår 1973–2006" (Swedish) 

Municipal elections in Stockholm
1991 elections in Sweden
1990s in Stockholm
September 1991 events in Europe